The Bernadotte Bridge at Bernadotte, built in 1910, is one of nine metal highway bridges in Fulton County, Illinois listed on the National Register of Historic Places. The bridge is located along County Route 2 between Smithfield, Illinois to the north, and Ipava, Illinois to the south.  It was added to the National Register of Historic Places on October 29, 1980, along with the eight other bridges, as one of the "Metal Highway Bridges of Fulton County". The bridge is one of three near Smithfield listed on the Register, the others are the  Buckeye Bridge (now demolished) and the Tartar's Ferry Bridge. A fourth bridge near the Smithfield was included on the Register but removed in 1996, following its 1995 destruction.

Bernadotte Bridge is one of the few remaining bridges in this Multiple Property Submission group still standing, five of the nine have been destroyed. Fundraising is in place with the hope of restoring the bridge, which is current closed due to safety concerns.

Notes

External links

Save the Bernadotte Bridge

Road bridges on the National Register of Historic Places in Illinois
Bridges in Fulton County, Illinois
Bridges completed in 1910
National Register of Historic Places in Fulton County, Illinois
Metal bridges in the United States
Truss bridges in the United States